Heishui (Chinese: , lit. "Blackwater") may refer to:

the Hei River or Heishui, the headwaters of the Ruo Shui in Gansu & Inner Mongolia
the Dan River in Shaanxi, formerly known as the Heishui
the Jinsha River in Qinghai & Sichuan, formerly known as the Heishui
Heishui County, Sichuan
the Amur River in Manchuria, formerly known as the Heishui
Heishui Mohe, a tribe in Heilongjiang
Heishui, Liaoning, a town
Heishui, Jilin, a town